The National Crisis Management Centre (NCMC), also known as the Beehive Bunker, is the New Zealand government crisis management command centre situated under the "Beehive" building in Wellington.

It is designed to withstand earthquakes rated 'Intense' (X) on the Modified Mercalli scale, and is maintained by the National Emergency Management Agency to be always ready for an emergency.

References

External links 
 New Zealand Parliament - The Beehive — Executive Wing
 NZPA Images - Wellington-National Crisis Management Centre

Buildings and structures in Wellington City
Bunkers
Emergency management in New Zealand